Hong Kong participated in the 1954 Asian Games held in the capital city of Manila, Philippines. This country was ranked 13th with 1 bronze medal.

Medalists

Medal summary

Medal table

References

Nations at the 1954 Asian Games
Hong Kong at the Asian Games
1954 in Hong Kong